The San Jose Improv is a comedy club located in San Jose, California.

History
Formerly known as the Jose Theater, built in 1904, is the oldest theater in San Jose, located on Second Street, near San Fernando Street.  Construction of the Jose was started in 1903, under the ownership of David Jacks, a Monterey landowner (who was the namesake of Monterrey Jack cheese).  At that time, the theater was a popular showcase for stock companies and vaudeville acts.

Despite rumors, neither Charlie Chaplin nor Harry Houdini ever performed at this location, although both toured through nearby San Francisco.  

Today, it is home to the San Jose franchise of the famous Improv Comedy Club chain and is owned by LEG.

External links
Improv Comedy Club San Jose
History of The Jose Theater
History of The Improv
Cinema Treasures ranks San Jose Improv San Jose's oldest theatre

References

Improv, The
Improv, The
Buildings and structures in San Jose, California
Tourist attractions in San Jose, California